Black Diamond is the tenth album by American Jazz group The Rippingtons. Released in 1997, it was their first project for the Windham Hill label. The album reached number one on Billboard's contemporary jazz chart.

Track listing
All tracks written by Russ Freeman except where noted.
"Black Diamond" – 4:46
"Deep Powder" – 6:16
"Seven Nights in Rome" – 5:05
"Soul Seeker" – 4:40
"In Another Life" – 5:41
"Big Sky" – 4:23
"If I Owned the World" (Russ Freeman, Mark Williamson) – 3:39
"North Peak" – 4:12
"Angelfire" – 4:13
"Jewel Thieves" – 5:05
"Black Diamond" (Acoustic Version) – 4:09

Personnel 

The Rippingtons
 Russ Freeman – keyboards, acoustic guitar, baritone guitar, classical guitar, electric guitars, 12-string guitar, mandolin, bass, drum programming, rhythm loops, rhythm programming, percussion 
 David Kochanski – keyboards (1, 2, 4, 5, 6, 8, 10, 11), organ (1, 2, 4, 5, 6, 8, 10, 11)
 Kim Stone – bass (1, 3, 6, 8, 10, 11), fretless bass (1, 3, 6, 8, 10, 11)
 Steve Reid – percussion (8, 11)
 Jeff Kashiwa – EWI controller (1), tenor saxophone (2, 4), tenor sax solo (2), soprano saxophone (11)

Guest Musicians
 Mark Williamson – backing vocals (1, 2, 4, 6, 7, 8, 10, 11), lead vocals (7), acoustic guitar (7), percussion (7)
 Pete Escovedo – percussion (9)
 Nelson Rangell – alto saxophone (10), tenor saxophone (10), flute (10)
 Mark Ledford – trumpet (5)
 Arturo Sandoval – trumpet solo (9)

Production 
 Russ Freeman – producer, executive producer, arrangements, recording, mixing 
 Carl Griffin – producer (trumpet sessions on Tracks 5 & 9), mixing
 Andi Howard – executive producer, management 
 Paul Wickliffe – additional engineer
 Ray Obiedo – assistant engineer
 John Reigart III – assistant engineer
 Brian Springer – assistant engineer
 Nick Sodano – mixing 
 Doug Sax – mastering 
 Patrick Clifford – A&R 
 Larry Hamby – A&R
 Sonny Mediana – art direction 
 Ilene Weingard – design 
 Bill Mayer – illustration 
 Carl Studna – photography

Studios
 Recorded and Mixed at Cheyenne Mountain Ranch Studios (Colorado).
 Additional recording at Sound On Sound (New York City, New York). 
 Assistant recording at Werewolf Studio (Oakland, California) and Sonic Jungle Studios (North Hollywood, California).
 Mastered at The Mastering Lab (Hollywood, California).

Charts

References

External links
The Rippingtons-Black Diamond at Discogs
The Rippingtons-Black Diamond at AllMusic
The Rippingtons Official Website

1997 albums
Windham Hill Records albums
The Rippingtons albums